Mariya Aleksandrovna Kozhevnikova (born November 14, 1984) is a Russian actress and a politician.

Kozhevnikova was voted the hottest woman in Russia in November 2011. She was a Deputy of the State Duma of the Russian Federation (2011–2016).

Early life and career
Kozhevnikova was born at November 14, 1984 in the family of a Soviet hockey player, two-time Olympic champion, Merited Master of Sports Alexander Kozhevnikov and English teacher Margarita Kozhevnikova. 

Kozhevnikova's grandfather, Major General, participant of the Great Patriotic War Valentin Nikolaevich Trofimov (1923-2013).

Kozhevnikova has a brother and a sister.

Kozhevnikova is the "Master of Sports" in rhythmic gymnastics, champion of Moscow. Graduated from the RATI-GITIS in 2006.

In 2001, when Kozhevnikova was only a teenager, she starred in the video for the song "You Will Become An Adult" by the Lyceum group. In 2002, Kozhevnikova chose RATI-GITIS to participate in the Love Stories music group. In 2005, while studying at the institute, she began her career as an actress, participating in extras and playing secondary roles.

Kozhevnikova is known for her role in the Russian TV series "Univer".

In September 2009, The Playboy magazine published eight photographs of Kozhevnikova, in five of which she is completely naked.

Personal life
At the end of August 2013, Kozhevnikova and her boyfriend at the time, businessman Yevgeny Vasilyev, got married in St. Nicholas Cathedral in Nice, France. The official registration of the marriage did not take place, which means that they are not officially married at the moment.

Kozhevnikova has three children, all of them are boys.

Filmography

Films

TV series

References

External links
 
 

1984 births
Living people
Russian film actresses
Russian television actresses
21st-century Russian actresses
Actresses from Moscow
Russian Academy of Theatre Arts alumni
Russian television presenters
United Russia politicians
21st-century Russian politicians
Russian actor-politicians
Russian women television presenters
Sixth convocation members of the State Duma (Russian Federation)